OpenResty is an nginx distribution which includes the LuaJIT interpreter for Lua scripts. The software was created by Yichun Zhang. It was originally sponsored by Taobao before 2011 and was mainly supported by Cloudflare from 2012 to 2016. Since 2017, it has been mainly supported by OpenResty Software Foundation and OpenResty Inc.

OpenResty is designed to build scalable web applications, web services, and dynamic web gateways. The OpenResty architecture is based on several nginx modules which have been extended in order to expand nginx into a web app server to handle large number of requests. The concept of the OpenResty solution aims to run server-side web app completely in the nginx server, leveraging nginx event model to do non-blocking I/O not only with the HTTP clients, but also with remote backends like MySQL, PostgreSQL, Memcached, and Redis.

History 
In October 2007, OpenResty began at Yahoo! China as an Open API web service framework written mostly in Perl.

In September 2009, OpenResty was redeveloped at Taobao as ngx_openresty, a Lua application server based upon an extended repackaging of nginx and LuaJIT with plug-in server extension modules written in C.

See also 
Tarantool

References

External links 
 

Web server software
Lua (programming language)-scriptable software
Web server software for Linux